Best of the Family Brown is the second compilation album by Canadian country music group Family Brown. It was released by RCA Records in 1980.

Track listing

Chart performance

References

1980 compilation albums
Family Brown albums
RCA Records compilation albums